The 1st Asian Winter Games were held from March 1 to 8, 1986 in Sapporo, Hokkaidō, Japan.  The Japanese Olympic Committee first suggested the idea of having a continent-wide winter version of the Asian Games in 1982. With Sapporo's expertise and infrastructure available after successfully hosting the 1972 Winter Olympics, the Olympic Council of Asia General Assembly in Seoul in 1984 decided to give Japan the privilege of hosting the first ever Asian Winter Games. Participating in a total of 35 events in seven sports were 430 athletes and officials from seven countries.

Sports
A total of 35 events from 4 sports and 7 disciplines were held in the First Asian Winter Games. Large-hill (90m) Ski jumping was a demonstration sport.
 
 
 
 
 
 
 

Demonstration sports

Participating nations
7 National Olympic Committees (NOC) entered teams in the 1986 Asian Winter Games. Below is a list of the nations with the number of competitors indicated in brackets.

Medal table

References

 
Asian Games
Asian
Asian Winter Games
Asian Games
Asian Winter Games
Multi-sport events in Japan
Winter Games
Sports competitions in Sapporo
20th century in Sapporo